-Lysergic acid α-hydroxyethylamide (LSH, LAH), also known as -lysergic acid methyl carbinolamide, is an alkaloid of the ergoline family, believed to be present in small amounts in various species in the Convolvulaceae (morning glory), as well as some species of fungi.

Chemistry 

The structure is similar to LSD, with the N,N- diethylamide group replaced by an N- (1- hydroxyethyl)amide in -lysergic acid α-hydroxyethylamide.

Pharmacology 
LSH has an affinity for several dopamine and serotonin recetors in the human brain. LSD is a partial agonist on many dopamine and serotonin receptors, so it is highly likely that LSH is also an agonist at dopamine and serotonin receptors. LSH has an affinity for the following receptors: 5-HT2A, 5-HT2B, 5-HT2C, 5-HT6, 5-HT1D, 5-HT1A, D1 and D2.

Effects 

One of the  alkaloids in the seeds of Rivea corymbosa (Ololiuhqui), Argyreia nervosa (Hawaiian Baby Woodrose), and Ipomoea violacea (Tlitliltzin)  are ergine (LSA) and isoergine (its epimer). The human activity of -lysergic acid α-hydroxyethylamide is unknown.

Legality 

-lysergic acid α-hydroxyethylamide is unscheduled and uncontrolled in the United States, but possession and sales of it for human consumption could potentially be prosecuted under the Federal Analog Act because of its structural similarities to LSD.

See also 

 Ergoline
 Lysergic acid
 LSA
 LSD
 Ergot
 Hawaiian baby woodrose (Argyreia nervosa)
 Ololiuhqui (Rivea corymbosa)
 Tlitliltzin (Ipomoea violacea)

References

External links 
 Ergot - A Rich Source of Pharmacologically Active Substances by Albert Hofmann

Lysergamides
Secondary alcohols
Ergot alkaloids